Gregorio Luperón (September 8, 1839 – May 21, 1897) was a Dominican president, military general, businessman, liberal politician, freemason, and Statesman who was one of the leaders in the Restoration of the Dominican Republic after the Spanish annexation in 1863.

Luperón was an active member of the Triunvirato of 1866, becoming the President of the Provincial Government in San Felipe de Puerto Plata, and after the successful coup against Cesareo Guillermo, he became the 28th President of the Dominican Republic. During his government in 1879, he incentivised secularism in the Dominican Republic with the help of the General Captain of Puerto Rico and Eugenio María de Hostos.

Biography
Gregorio Luperón was born 8 September 1839 in Puerto Plata to Pedro Castellanos, a White Dominican, and Nicolasa du Perron (the surname du Perron would later become "Luperón", to sound more Spanish), a black immigrant from the Lesser Antilles. His parents owned a ventorrillo (rudimentary market stall) that sold homemade foodstuffs such as piñonate, a local delicacy made of sweetened pine-nut kernels. Most of these were sold on the street by Gregorio and his siblings in order to help the family livelihood.

Around the age of 14, Gregorio began working for Pedro Eduardo Dubocq, a local timber businessman of French origin. While working there, he displayed a strong strength of character and a knack for getting any job assigned to him completed in the best possible fashion. Because of this, Mr. Dubocq promoted Gregorio to a management position. Mr. Dubocq also allowed Gregorio to spend time in his personal library because Gregorio wanted to enrich his intellect.

In 1861, the annexation of the Dominican Republic by Spain took place. Gregorio was only 22 years old at the time but a sense of nationalism began to swell within him. During one instance, Gregorio was arrested but managed to escape and flee to the United States for protection. Shortly thereafter, Gregorio managed to return to the Dominican Republic through the town of Monte Cristi in time to take part in the uprising of Sabaneta de Yásica (1863). However, this uprising was short-lived due to the quick Spanish response.

After the failure at Sabaneta, Gregorio and his compatriots hid in the mountains of La Vega in order to prepare for a full-scale revolution against the Spanish forces.

War of Santo Domingo 
After the so-called Grito de Capotillo (Call of Capotillo) on August 16, 1863, the successful raid at Capotillo Hill close to Dajabon under the command of Santiago Rodriguez and 14 other men, it was Luperon's time to take the initiative in the Provinces of Moca and La Vega where he would earn the rank of General.

As soon as it was possible, he joined the operations at Santiago where he was left in charge of the Chief Commander from the war of the Restauracion, General Gaspar Polanco, who had been designated so by the Council consisting of Pedro Antonio Pimentel, Benito Moncion, and Jose Antonio (Pepillo) Salcedo, for his military service in the first republic. From his post, he hostilized the Spaniards on September 6, 1863 in the Battle of Santiago.

He was a man of strong patriotic convictions and great valor, knowledgeable in both military tactics and strategy. These qualities made him the choice of general Pedro Santana as Chief Superior of Operations for the invasion of el Cibao and the eastern and southern provinces. In Santo Domingo, he attacked the Spanish Army commanded by Santana head-on, in a battle known as Marques de las Carreras. Although powerful and disciplined, the Spanish forces were defeated with guerrilla tactics, forced on Luperón by the inferior number of his troops and the quality of their weapons and resources.

From there he re-enforced operations in the provinces of Bani and San Cristobal where he expelled the enemy. He returned to Santiago where he put his support behind Gaspar Polanco's government, even though Polanco had refused to participate in the movement to oust Salcedo. Luperón understood that under Polanco's government the War for Restoration would once again regain the momentum and vigor that it had lost during Salcedo's government.

Battle of Bermejo Creek 
On September 30 of 1863 in Bermejo de Don Juan River (Monte Plata), at one point along the borders of that creek, as General Santana was attempting to reach the slope at Sillon de la Viuda, which would have meant sure defeat for Luperón, ending the revolution, both Spanish and of the Republic ships came face to face the river's small Rubicon area, and Luperón's forces were able to attack the Spanish and block their passage.

After this strategic move, both armies engaged in battle on land, resulting in defeat for General Santana and subsequently Salcedo's Presidency, as Luperón occupied San Pedro.

Santana was forced to seek refuge at the general barracks of Guanuma, where sickness fell upon his army, and the very next day President Salcedo established his new barracks at Monte Plata, where he designated Benigno Filomeno de Rojas as the General in Chief of their eastern forces, once Luperón's occupation. President Salcedo stood in Monte Plata for 6 days.

Post War of Restoration 

With the Spanish Army now defeated, Luperón accepted the position of Vice President of the government under Benigno Filomeno de Rojas. Having seen the Republic fully restored, he returned to his birth place of Puerto Plata and opened a shop.

He opposed the return of Buenaventura Baez to power, who would have him exiled and expelled from the country. A few months later, Luperón returned as part of the Triunvirato of 1866, which would eventually topple Baez and form a new government. That same year, the Triunvirato agreed to dissolve and allow General Jose Maria Cabral to ascend to the Presidency, with the caveat that a new constitution would be created.

New exile 

The Government of Jose Maria Cabral would later be retaken by Buenaventura Baez, which once again forced Luperón to leave the country for his opposition to Baez, who is looking to the United States for support.

Luperón manages to put together a revolutionary expedition name "El Telegrafo" The Telegraph, after the steamboat baring the same name, but would ultimately fail due to the intervention of the United States, that were in talks of purchasing the Samaná Peninsula. This would reinvigorate Luperón's desire to return to his land, and regained public support from Latin America, even sending protesters to the United States Senate.

When Baez was expelled from power in the Unionist Revolution in 1873, Luperón was able to safely return to Puerto Plata.

Provincial President and Minister 
With the rise of Ulises Espaillat to the Presidency, Luperón is named the Minister of War and Marines. But with the removal of Espaillat, he is once again forced to flee, and waits almost 2 years while his enemies Gonzalez and Baez shift power for a stealth return.

In 1879, Luperón attended a banquet in France, where in Paris he was proclaimed Honorary President of the Salvadores de Sena and Salvadores de Francia Societies, apart from being also decorated with the Legion de Honor.

Following the coup of Cesareo Guillermo, Luperón assumes the Presidency of the Provincial Government of Puerto Plata, where his Twelve months of governance were of peace, liberty, and progress which produced a free and fair election in 1880, in which the Presbyterian Fernando Arturo de Merino was elected President of the republic, also backed by Luperón.

In this new government, hes was named Extraordinary Envoy and Plenipotentiary Minister in Europe. Returning to the Republic, he is named Governing Delegate of the Cibao under Francisco Gregorio Billini.  Upon resigning in 1885, he partners with the Vice President Alejandro Woss y Gil.

Revolution of 1886 

Upon the inception of the Revolution of 1886, and from his post, Luperón engages in battle in Puerto Plata, contributing greatly to triumph of Ulises Heureaux and his Presidency in 1887.

Heureaux, also of Puerto Plata, and who had been a valiant preservationist like Luperón, began to developed a despotic and dictatorial government, which mustered up a strong sentiment of regret and deception in Luperón, causing him to go abroad to form a campaign against Heureaux, but without the support of the Haitian Government, the campaign was a failure.

Final exile 
Around the year 1895, General Luperón began to complained about having neuralgia from one his inferior molars and had it removed, yet the cavity where the molar extracted had not been codifying or scaring, causing an infection.

His feet would later begin to swell, from months of sitting down as he wrote his autobiography, so said his daughter at the time, and had been under medication from the doctors in Saint Thomas.

In 1896, Doctor Mortensen had explained his grave medical situation, to which Luperón said, that if he is going to die in just a few days, he wanted to know how much the doctor charged for an embalmment so that his body may be sent to Puerto Plata. Up until that point, it had not occurred to him to return to the Dominican Republic while Ulises Heareaux was still president.

In December 1896, in a gesture of gratitude for his past service, Heareaux went to visit Luperón on Saint Thomas, forgetting their rivalry, and offering to take Luperón back with him to Puerto Plata. Luperón accepts, but declines returning on the same boat as Heareaux, and traveled on an alternate vessel.

Death 

On December 15 of 1896, Luperón departs from Saint Thomas to Puerto Plata and arrived at the Port of Santo Domingo very ill, and remains on board. President Heareaux visits him on board and provided a foreign doctor named Dr. Fosse to assist him in San Felipe de Puerto Plata, and takes care of Luperón during the final 5 months of his life. For those months he had been bedridden and before his final breaths on May 20, 1897 said "Men like me, should not die laying down", and as he attempted to lift his head, he passed away at 9:30 p.m.  in his beloved birthplace of Puerto Plata.

Masonry 

He began his masonry studies in the Logia Nuevo Mundo No. 5, in the province of Santiago de los Caballeros where he would reach the highest 33rd Degree of Masonry.

On September 25 of 1867, Luperón became a sectarian member of the Installation Commission of the reputable Masonic Restoration Lodge No. 11 in Puerto Plata, becoming a founder himself, becoming the Lodges first Orator. His guide and mentor was Venerable Master Don Pedro Eduardo Dubocq, who was a friend of Juan Pablo Duarte.

During Luperón's government in 1879, he widely incentivized Secularism with the help of a Spanish Captain General of Puerto Rico, Eugenio Maria de Hostos.

Legacy

The town of Luperón 50 km west of Puerto Plata, the Gregorio Luperón International Airport in Puerto Plata, a metro station in Santo Domingo, and the Gregorio Luperón High School for Math & Science in New York are named after him.

His former home was renovated and converted into the Casa Museo General Gregorio Luperón museum that showcases his life through various exhibits.

References

External links 

|-

1839 births
1897 deaths
19th-century rebels
People from Puerto Plata, Dominican Republic
Dominican Republic people of Spanish descent
Presidents of the Dominican Republic
Vice presidents of the Dominican Republic
People of the Dominican Restoration War
People of the Six Years' War
Dominican Republic revolutionaries
Dominican Republic military personnel
Dominican Republic independence activists
Mixed-race Dominicans